João Sousa was the defending champion but chose not to compete.
Jiří Veselý defeated Simon Greul 6–1, 6–1 in the final to win the title.

Seeds

Draw

Finals

Top half

Bottom half

References
 Main Draw
 Qualifying Draw

Mersin Cup - Singles
2013 Singles